Fabio Borriello (born 16 December 1985) is an Italian former professional footballer who played as a defender.

Career
After starting his career with Eccellenza side Cervia, Borriello won a professional contract with Milan in 2005 through a football Reality television show called Campioni, il sogno. He was sent on loan to Serie C2 clubs Lecco and Pro Vasto, but still had limited playing opportunities.

On 21 July 2007, he was transferred to Swiss Challenge League side AC Lugano.

Personal life
Fabio is the brother of fellow Italian footballer Marco, who formerly represented Italy at international level. For a time he was in a relationship with Italian pop singer Emma Marrone; the couple split in September 2014. After retiring from football he became the CEO of the real estate company FB Internazionale SAGL.

References

External links
 
 Profile at MagliaRossonera.it 

1985 births
Living people
Italian footballers
Italian expatriate footballers
A.C. Milan players
Vastese Calcio 1902 players
FC Lugano players
Expatriate footballers in Switzerland
Italian expatriate sportspeople in Switzerland
Association football defenders
Footballers from Naples